Mike & Mike's Excellent X-Canada Adventures is a TV show that ran on the MuchMusic network until 1993.  The co-hosts of the show were Mike Campbell and Mike Rhodes.

The "Mike and Mike" show ran on MuchMusic from 1986 until 1992. The premise was basic: two guys on a very limited budget profiling a different "city" (it was often a town) in Canada every week from a MuchMusic perspective. It was one of the few shows on the network that independently programmed videos.

Much (TV channel) original programming